Məlcək (also, Mel’dzhek) is a village in the Shamakhi Rayon of Azerbaijan.  The village forms part of the municipality of Mirikənd.

References 

Populated places in Shamakhi District